Cape Jones is the cape lying immediately southeast of Mount Lubbock and marking the southern tip of the Daniell Peninsula in Victoria Land, Antarctica. It was discovered in January 1841 by Sir James Clark Ross who named it for Captain William Jones, Royal Navy.

References

Headlands of Victoria Land
Borchgrevink Coast